Cold on the Shoulder is an album by American guitarist Tony Rice, released in 1984. Originally intended as a follow-up of the 1979 album Manzanita, which doesn't include 5-string banjo, Rice decided to add it to this album for some of the tracks.

Track listing 
 "Cold on the Shoulder" (Gordon Lightfoot) – 2:33
 "Wayfaring Stranger" (Traditional) – 5:21
 "John Hardy" (Traditional) – 3:27
 "Fare Thee Well" (Traditional) – 3:19
 "Bitter Green" (Gordon Lightfoot) – 2:43
 "Mule Skinner Blues" (Jimmie Rodgers) – 4:20
 "Song for Life" (Rodney Crowell) – 2:58
 "Why Don't You Tell Me So" (Lester Flatt) – 3:09
 "If You Only Knew" (Larry Rice) – 2:14
 "Likes of Me" (Jerry Reed) – 2:58
 "I Think It's Going to Rain Today" (Randy Newman) – 2:39

Personnel 
 Tony Rice – guitar, vocals
 Sam Bush – mandolin
 Vassar Clements – fiddle
 J. D. Crowe – banjo, background vocals
 Jerry Douglas – dobro
 Béla Fleck – banjo
 Bobby Hicks – fiddle
 Larry Rice – mandolin, background vocals
 Kate Wolf – background vocals
 Todd Phillips – bass

Production notes:
 Tony Rice – producer
 Bill Wolf – engineer, mixing
 George Horn – mastering
 Elizabeth Weil – design

References 

1984 albums
Tony Rice albums
Rounder Records albums